Existence after death in the afterlife is generally taken to mean the survival of the essence of an individual once the individual's body in this world has died.

After death may also refer to:

Anno Domini (AD), a Latin phrase indicating years after the estimated birth of Jesus, often mistaken to mean "after death."
After Death, a 1989 Italian horror film
"After [the] death", the translation (from Biblical Hebrew) of Acharei Mot, the 29th weekly Torah portion in the annual Jewish cycle of Torah reading
AfterDeath, a 2015 British horror film
After Death (1915 film), a Russian 1915 short film
After Death (2012 film), a British 2012 film

See also
Afterlife (disambiguation)
Life after death (disambiguation)
Resurrection of the dead
World to come